1875 in sports describes the year's events in world sport.

American football
College championship
 College football national championship – Harvard Crimson
Events
 13 November — first edition of "The Game", the annual contest between Yale Bulldogs and Harvard Crimson, is played under a modified set of rugby football rules known as "The Concessionary Rules". Yale loses 4–0, but finds that it prefers Harvard's adopted rugby style game.

Association football
England
 FA Cup final – Royal Engineers 2–0 Old Etonians in a replay following a 1–1 draw (both games played at The Oval).
 5 November — Blackburn Rovers founded at a meeting of enthusiasts in the St Leger Hotel, King William St, Blackburn.
 Birmingham City founded as Small Heath Alliance by cricketers from Holy Trinity Church in the Bordesley Green area of Birmingham.
 Introduction of crossbars.
 Wing play develops and the practice of "middling" (i.e., crossing) the ball is found to be effective.  Heading is also introduced, apparently by players in Sheffield.  Billy Mosforth of Sheffield FC is noted for his "screw shot" which gives him the ability to "bend" the ball in flight.
Scotland
 Scottish Cup final – Queen's Park 3–0 Renton at Hampden Park
 Hibernian FC founded in Edinburgh by Irish immigrants who give the club the Roman name for Ireland.

Baseball
National championship
 National Association of Professional Base Ball Players champion – Boston Red Stockings (fourth consecutive season)

Boxing
Events
 No major bouts take place in 1875.  Tom Allen retains the American Championship.

Cricket
Events
 18 August — formation of Somerset County Cricket Club by a team of amateurs at a meeting in Sidmouth, Devonshire, immediately after a match against a local side.
England
 Champion County –  Nottinghamshire
 Most runs – W. G. Grace 1,498 @ 32.56 (HS 152)
 Most wickets – W. G. Grace 191 @ 12.94 (BB 9–48)

Golf
Major tournaments
 British Open – Willie Park senior

Horse racing
Events
 Inaugural running of the Kentucky Derby is won by Aristides
England
 Grand National – Pathfinder
 1,000 Guineas Stakes – Spinaway
 2,000 Guineas Stakes – Camballo
 The Derby – Galopin
 The Oaks – Spinaway
 St. Leger Stakes – Craig Millar
Australia
 Melbourne Cup – Wollomai
Canada 
 Queen's Plate – Young Trumpeter
Ireland 
 Irish Grand National – Scots Grey
 Irish Derby Stakes – Innishowen
USA
 Kentucky Derby – Aristides
 Preakness Stakes – Tom Ochiltree
 Belmont Stakes – Calvin

Ice hockey
Events
 3 March — first organised and recorded indoor game of ice hockey is played at the Victoria Skating Rink in Montreal.

Rowing
The Boat Race
 20 March — Oxford wins the 32nd Oxford and Cambridge Boat Race

Rugby football
Events
 Barrow RLFC and Leinster Rugby are established in 1875

References

 
Sports by year